Howells may refer to:

People
Howells (surname)

Places in the United States
Howells, Colorado, a place in Colorado
Howells, Nebraska
Howells, New York
Howells Junction, New York, a place in New York

Business establishments
Howells (department store), the largest department store in Cardiff, Wales, established by James Howell
Howells & Stokes, a defunct architectural firm founded 1897 in New Haven, Connecticut, USA

Educational establishments
Howell's School, Denbigh, former independent girls' school in Denbigh in the United Kingdom. 
Howell's School, Llandaff, an independent girls' school in Llandaff in the United Kingdom.

See also
Howell (disambiguation)